South Texas College (STC) is a public community college in the Rio Grande Valley region of South Texas.  It is accredited by the Commission on Colleges of the Southern Association of Colleges and Schools to award Bachelor of Applied Technology, Associate of Applied Science, Associate of Arts, and Associate of Science degrees. STC has an enrollment of approximately 31,000 students and a staff of 1,600 working across six campuses. It was created on September 1, 1993 with the passage of Texas Senate Bill 251, the purpose of which was to serve Hidalgo and Starr County.

As defined by the Texas Legislature, the official service area of STC includes all of Hidalgo and Starr Counties.

Campuses
 Pecan Campus (main), McAllen, Texas
 Mid-Valley Campus, Weslaco, Texas
 Starr County Campus, Rio Grande City, Texas
 Technology Campus, McAllen, Texas
 Ramiro R. Casso Nursing & Allied Health Campus, McAllen, Texas
 E-STC Virtual Campus

Academics

South Texas College is accredited by the Commission on Colleges of the Southern Association of Colleges and Schools to award Bachelor of Applied Technology, Associate of Applied Science, Associate of Arts and Associate of Science degrees and certificates. The college offers more than 100 degree and certificate program options, including associate degrees in a variety of art, science, technology and allied health fields of study. The college also offers the Bachelor of Applied Technology degree as well as online degree and certificate options.

South Texas College employs 428 full-time and 228 adjunct instructors. There are 384 faculty members with master's degrees, 46 hold two master's, 5 hold three master's, and 79 have doctorate degrees. In certificate and other programs, there are 97 faculty members holding bachelor's degrees and 44 with associate degrees. STC has more than 60 articulation agreements in place with colleges across the country for those students who wish to continue their education beyond an associate degree.

North American Advanced Manufacturing Research and Education Initiative (NAAMREI)
The college is the fiscal agent and home of the executive offices for the North American Advanced Manufacturing Research and Education Initiative. STC serves as the Regional Institute for Advanced Manufacturing linked to all the community and technical colleges in the region. The college has taken the lead in helping train the workers to fuel a regional manufacturing economy and to support innovations in rapid response manufacturing.

Notable people

Notable faculty
William L. (Bill) Greene (born 1964), American political science professor and faithless elector (2016)

Notable alumni
Dr. Leo Lopez III (born 1989), National Hispanic Medical Association National Hispanic Resident of the Year (2017)
Mayra Flores (born 1985-1986), Member of the U.S. House of Representatives from Texas's 34th district

Photos

References

External links

Education in McAllen, Texas
Community colleges in Texas
Education in Hidalgo County, Texas
Education in Starr County, Texas
Educational institutions established in 1993
Buildings and structures in Hidalgo County, Texas
Buildings and structures in Starr County, Texas
1993 establishments in Texas
Two-year colleges in the United States